Frank Glover (born June 27, 1963) is a contemporary jazz musician and composer from Indianapolis, Indiana. Although he plays saxophone as well, Glover's primary instrument is the clarinet. For decades, his mentor and collaborator was Indianapolis jazz pianist Claude Sifferlen. Glover is based in southern Indiana where he teaches music theory and improvisation from his studio near the T.C. Steele Historic Site.

Discography
 Mosaic (1991)
 Something Old, Something New (1994)
 Siamese Twins (1999)
 Politico (Owl, 2005)
 Abacus (Owl, 2010)
Mīm (2019)

References

External links
 Take 2 WFYI documentary
 Siamese Twins review
 Nuvo top 10
 

1963 births
Living people
American jazz clarinetists
American jazz composers
American male jazz composers
American jazz saxophonists
American male saxophonists
Owl Studios artists
Hard bop clarinetists
Hard bop saxophonists
Mainstream jazz clarinetists
Mainstream jazz saxophonists
Musicians from Indiana
Post-bop saxophonists
Post-bop clarinetists
Third stream saxophonists
Third stream clarinetists
21st-century American saxophonists
21st-century clarinetists
21st-century American male musicians